Tomii (written: 富井 or 富居) is a Japanese surname. Notable people with the surname include:

, Japanese diplomat
, Japanese footballer
, Japanese footballer
, Japanese Nordic combined skier
, Japanese alpine skier
, Japanese modern pentathlete
, Japanese alpine skier
, Japanese alpine skier

Japanese-language surnames